St. Louis Church may refer to:

 St. Louis Church (Fall River, Massachusetts)
 St. Louis Church (Louisville, Ohio)
 St. Louis Church (Caledonia, Wisconsin)
  St. Louis Church (Leiden, The Netherlands)
 Saint-Louis Church, Rouen
 St. Louis Roman Catholic Church